John Lang was a professional American football player. In 1902 he won a championship in the first National Football League with the Pittsburgh Stars. A year later he was a member of the Franklin Athletic Club football team that was considered the "best in the world". He also won the 1903 World Series of Football, held at Madison Square Garden, with the Franklin Athletic Club.

Lang then spent the 1904 and 1905 seasons with the Massillon Tigers of the Ohio League. In 1906, he was convinced by Blondy Wallace, coach of the Canton Bulldogs to join the Bulldogs. He jumped from the Tigers to the Bulldogs along with Jack Hayden, Herman Kerchoff, and Clark Schrontz. That season Canton played Massillon in a two game home-and-home series to determine the 1906 Ohio League championship. While Canton won the first game of the series, Massillon won the second game (and under rules determined by both team) the championship. Canton was later accused of throwing the championship in a betting scandal.

Prior to his professional career Jack played three years at tackle while attending Washington and Jefferson College.

Lang also coached the 1905 Westminster College team of New Wilmington, Pennsylvania, leading the team to a 9–2 record.

Head coaching record

References

Year of birth missing
Year of death missing
Place of birth missing
American football ends
Canton Bulldogs (Ohio League) players
Franklin Athletic Club players
Massillon Tigers players
Pittsburgh Stars players
Westminster Titans football coaches
Washington & Jefferson Presidents football players